Roksana is a female given name. Roksana is the name of:

 Roksana Tymchenko (birth 1991), a Ukrainian alpine skier
 Roksana Bahramitash a Canadian sociologist of Iranian background 
 Kaniz Fatema Roksana (death 1984), first Bangladeshi woman commercial pilot
 Roksana Węgiel, a Polish singer who won the Junior Eurovision Song Contest 2018

See also
Ruksana (disambiguation)
Ruksana Begum